The Arctic sea ice covers less area in the summer than in the winter. The multi-year (i.e. perennial) sea ice covers nearly all of the central deep basins.  The Arctic sea ice and its related biota are unique, and the year-round persistence of the ice has allowed the development of ice endemic species, meaning species not found anywhere else.

There are differing scientific opinions about how long perennial sea ice has existed in the Arctic. Estimates range from 700,000 to 4 million years.

Endemic species
The specialized, sympagic (i.e. ice-associated) community within the sea ice is found in the tiny (mostly <1mm diameter) liquid filled network of pores and brine channels or at the ice-water interface. The organisms living within the sea ice are consequently small (<1mm), and dominated by bacteria, and unicellular plants and animals. Diatoms, a certain type of algae, are considered the most important primary producers inside the ice with more than 200 species occurring in Arctic sea ice. In addition, flagellates contribute substantially to biodiversity, but their species number is unknown.

Protozoan and metazoan ice meiofauna, in particular turbellarians, nematodes, crustaceans and rotifers, can be abundant in all ice types year-round. In spring, larvae and juveniles of benthic animals (e.g. polychaetes and molluscs) migrate into coastal fast ice to feed on the ice algae for a few weeks.

A partially endemic fauna, comprising mainly gammaridean amphipods, thrives at the underside of ice floes. Locally and seasonally occurring at several hundred individuals per square meter, they are important mediators for particulate organic matter from the sea ice to the water column. Ice-associated and pelagic crustaceans are the major food sources for polar cod (Boreogadus saida) that occurs in close association with sea ice and acts as the major link from the ice-related food web to seals and whales.

While previous studies of coastal and offshore sea ice provided a glimpse of the seasonal and regional abundances and the diversity of the ice-associated biota, biodiversity in these communities is virtually unknown for all groups, from bacteria to metazoans. Many taxa are likely still undiscovered due to the methodological problems in analyzing ice samples. The study of diversity of ice related environments is urgently required before they ultimately change with altering ice regimes and the likely loss of the multi-year ice cover.

Dating Arctic ice
Estimates of how long the Arctic Ocean has had perennial ice cover vary. Those estimates range from 700,000 years in the opinion of Worsley and Herman, to 4 million years in the opinion of Clark.  Here is how Clark refuted the theory of Worsley and Herman:

Recently, a few coccoliths have been reported from late Pliocene and Pleistocene central Arctic sediment (Worsley and Herman, 1980). Although this is interpreted to indicate episodic ice-free conditions for the central Arctic, the occurrence of ice-rafted debris with the sparse coccoliths is more easily interpreted to represent transportation of coccoliths from ice-free continental seas marginal to the central Arctic. The sediment record as well as theoretical considerations make strong argument against alternating ice-covered and ice-free....The probable Middle Cenozoic development of an ice cover, accompanied by Antarctic ice development and a late shift of the Gulf Stream to its present position, were important events that led to the development of modern climates. The record suggests that altering the present ice cover would have profound effects on future climates.

More recently, Melnikov has noted that, "There is no common opinion on the age of the Arctic sea ice cover."  Experts apparently agree that the age of the perennial ice cover exceeds 700,000 years  but disagree about how much older it is.
However, some research indicates that a sea area north of Greenland may have been open during the Eemian interglacial 120,000 years ago.  Evidence of subpolar foraminifers (Turborotalita quinqueloba) indicate open water conditions in that area. This is in contrast to Holocene sediments that only show polar species.

See also
Arctic amplification
Arctic Climate Impact Assessment
Arctic ecology
Arctic Ocean
Arctic sea ice decline
Arctic shrinkage
Climate of the Arctic

Further reading
Bluhm, B., Gradinger R. (2008) "Regional Variability In Food Availability For Arctic Marine Mammals." Ecological Applications 18: S77–96 (link to free PDF)
Gradinger, R.R., K. Meiners, G.Plumley, Q. Zhang, and B.A. Bluhm (2005) "Abundance and composition of the sea-ice meiofauna in off-shore pack ice of the Beaufort Gyre in summer 2002 and 2003." Polar Biology 28: 171 – 181
Melnikov I.A.; Kolosova E.G.; Welch H.E.; Zhitina L.S. (2002) "Sea ice biological communities and nutrient dynamics in the Canada Basin of the Arctic Ocean." Deep Sea Res 49: 1623–1649.
Christian Nozais, Michel Gosselin, Christine Michel, Guglielmo Tita (2001) "Abundance, biomass, composition and grazing impact of the sea-ice meiofauna in the North Water, northern Baffin Bay." Mar Ecol Progr Ser 217: 235–250
Bluhm BA, Gradinger R, Piraino S. 2007. "First record of sympagic hydroids (Hydrozoa, Cnidaria) in Arctic coastal fast ice." Polar Biology 30: 1557–1563.
Horner, R. (1985) Sea Ice Biota. CRC Press.
Melnikov, I. (1997) The Arctic Sea Ice Ecosystem. Gordon and Breach Science Publishers.
Thomas, D., Dieckmann, G. (2003) Sea Ice. An Introduction to its Physics, Chemistry, Biology and Geology. Blackwell.

Footnotes

Environment of the Arctic
Fauna of the Arctic
Sea ice